Moritake may refer to:

 Moritake Tanabe (1889 – 1949), a general in the Imperial Japanese Army during World War II
 Arakida Moritake (1473-1549), son of Negi Morihide, and Shintoist
 Tomoko Moritake, Miss Japan in 1958
 Moritake Station a railway station on the JR East in Mitane (formerly Yamamoto) Japan